Cerithiopsis eliza is a species of sea snail, a gastropod in the family Cerithiopsidae. It was described by Dall in 1927.

Description 
The maximum recorded shell length is 3.6 mm.

Habitat 
Minimum recorded depth is 805 m. Maximum recorded depth is 805 m.

References

eliza
Gastropods described in 1927